The following is a list of the 107 municipalities (comuni) of the Province of South Sardinia, Sardinia, Italy.

A 
 Arbus
 Armungia

B 
 Ballao
 Barrali
 Barumini
 Buggerru
 Burcei

C 
 Calasetta
 Carbonia
 Carloforte
 Castiadas
 Collinas

D 
 Decimoputzu
 Dolianova
 Domus de Maria
 Domusnovas
 Donori

E 
 Escalaplano
 Escolca
 Esterzili

F 
 Fluminimaggiore
 Furtei

G 
 Genoni
 Genuri
 Gergei
 Gesico
 Gesturi
 Giba
 Goni
 Gonnesa
 Gonnosfanadiga
 Guamaggiore
 Guasila
 Guspini

I 
 Iglesias
 Isili

L 
 Las Plassas
 Lunamatrona

M 
 Mandas
 Masainas
 Monastir
 Muravera
 Musei

N 
 Narcao
 Nuragus
 Nurallao
 Nuraminis
 Nurri
 Nuxis

O 
 Orroli
 Ortacesus

P 
 Pabillonis
 Pauli Arbarei
 Perdaxius
 Pimentel
 Piscinas
 Portoscuso

S 
 Sadali
 Samassi
 Samatzai
 San Basilio 
 San Gavino Monreale
 San Giovanni Suergiu
 San Nicolò Gerrei
 San Sperate
 San Vito
 Sanluri
 Sant'Andrea Frius
 Sant'Anna Arresi
 Sant'Antioco
 Santadi
 Sardara
 Segariu
 Selegas
 Senorbì
 Serdiana
 Serramanna
 Serrenti
 Serri
 Setzu
 Seui
 Seulo
 Siddi
 Siliqua
 Silius
 Siurgus Donigala
 Soleminis
 Suelli

T 
 Teulada
 Tratalias
 Tuili
 Turri

U 
 Ussana
 Ussaramanna

V 
 Vallermosa
 Villacidro
 Villamar
 Villamassargia
 Villanova Tulo
 Villanovaforru
 Villanovafranca
 Villaperuccio
 Villaputzu
 Villasalto
 Villasimius
 Villasor
 Villaspeciosa

See also
List of municipalities of Italy

References

Sassari